Alan George Garner   (5 June 1929 – 1996) was a British Labour Party activist and trade unionist. Born and raised in Wolverhampton, he was a member of Wolverhampton Council, for the Spring Vale and Heath Town wards, from 1973 until his death, and vice-chair of the West Midlands Passenger Transport Authority between 1992 and 1996, during which time he was a strong advocate of the Midland Metro.

He received the British Empire Medal in the 1990 Birthday Honours. Midland Metro named an AnsaldoBreda T-69 tram after him.

References

External links 
 Tram 06 at TheTrams.co.uk – includes picture of nameplate

1929 births
1996 deaths
Date of death missing
Place of death missing
People from Wolverhampton
West Midlands Metro
Labour Party (UK) councillors
History of the West Midlands (county)
Councillors in Wolverhampton
English trade unionists
Recipients of the British Empire Medal
20th-century British businesspeople